Radmila Lolly (born May 10, 1986 in Moscow),  is a Russian-American singer, songwriter, and fashion designer. Her songs "U R Moving Me" and "Tonight" charted on Billboard Dance Club Songs list at positions 21 and 40 respectively. Her two studio albums were premiered at New York's Carnegie Hall and six of her songs were featured on the soundtrack for the film Honor Up, directed by Damon Dash. As a fashion designer she has created designs for celebrities such as Nicole Ari Parker, Natti Natasha, Carla Morrison, Gayle King, Bebe Rexha and Mýa. She appeared on the cover of the virtual edition of the magazines Elle India, Glamour Bulgaria and L'Officiel Baltic.

Biography

Musical career 
Lolly was born in Moscow, Russia on May 10, 1986. Since her childhood she became interested in music, especially in opera. Based in the United States, she released the singles "Black Star", "Hope", "Masquerade" and "When I'm With You" in 2015, and a year later she released her debut album, titled IV Stories at the Standard Hotel. On March 28, 2016, she presented the album at Carnegie Hall in New York accompanied by Colombian pianist Julián de la Chica and the Scorchio Quartet.

Wonderland, her second album, was also premiered at Carnegie Hall in an event entitled "A Night of Opera and Couture", in which Lolly performed live the entire record accompanied by a live orchestra and a fashion show with designs of her authorship. In 2018 she contributed with six songs for the soundtrack of the film Honor Up, directed by Damon Dash and produced by Kanye West.

On November 19, 2019, her song "U R Moving Me", a collaboration with singer Dani Hagan, was ranked number 21 on Billboard Dance Club Songs chart. On March 27, 2020 she again appeared on the same list with the song "Tonight", which climbed to the fortieth position. The same year she released two new singles: "Rule 1" and "Snake Body", the latter produced by Carlos A. Molina. 

In 2021, Radmila released her single "MAGIC". The song was written during lockdown as an ode to her new home, Miami, the "Magic City". In 2022, she collaborated with fellow Miami artist DJ Mike Tee to release MAGIC (Miami Beach House Remix). 

The artist is currently in the process of writing a novel, which she will accompany with a new studio album composed of 33 musical movements.

Fashion career and other activities 
Lolly started making her own outfits for her musical performances. She made the decision to launch her own couture label, Eltara Casata, as a result of how highly accepted her creations were. She presented her first haute couture collection at Gotham Hall in New York City, and on the occasion of the release of her album Wonderland, Lolly presented a new collection of her own. Her designs have appeared in several runway shows, including Barney's Madison Avenue Trunk Show and the Daytime Emmy Awards ceremony. Celebrities like Carla Morrison, Natti Natasha, Nicole Ari Parker, Gayle King, Bebe Rexha and Mýa have worn her designs.

In November 5, 2021, Lolly served as a speaker at the TEDxDupreePark talk.

In May 2022, Radmila went viral while sitting courtside for the Game 1 victory against the Philadelphia 76ers in the Eastern Conference semifinals. She drew attention for the gown she designed and wore, which was made out of upcycled Miami Heat jerseys.

Radmila is involved with numerous arts institutions and philanthropic organizations in her home of Miami, including joining the board of the Shalala Music Reach Foundation, and the board of the LEAP for Ladies Foundation.

Discography

Studio albums

Singles

References

External links 

 
 

1986 births
American women fashion designers
American fashion designers
American women singers
Russian emigrants to the United States
American songwriters
Living people
21st-century American women